The Krawatencross is a cyclo-cross race held in Lille, Belgium, which is part of the DVV Trophy.

Past winners

References
 Men's results
 Women's results

External links
 

Cyclo-cross races
Cycle races in Belgium
Recurring sporting events established in 1996
1996 establishments in Belgium
Sport in Antwerp Province
Lille, Belgium